Georgios Mitsiopoulos (born 23 November 1974) is a retired Greek football defender.

References

1974 births
Living people
Greek footballers
Panionios F.C. players
Paniliakos F.C. players
Panachaiki F.C. players
Agrotikos Asteras F.C. players
PAS Giannina F.C. players
Doxa Drama F.C. players
Olympiacos Volos F.C. players
Super League Greece players
Association football defenders
Footballers from Thessaloniki